Zhang Hong  (born 12 April 1988), alternatively spelled as Chang Hung is a Chinese long track speed skater, known best from her gold medal in the 1000 meters in the 2014 Winter Olympics in Sochi.

Previously Zhang won a bronze medal in the 2012 World Sprint Championships. She set two personal records and received bronze medal in the 500 meters (28 January 2012). Her total points record for the championships (all four races) was the third best of all times. She started her skating career in 2008 and had victories in the Chinese National Winter Games 2012 where she represented the People's Liberation Army delegation.

Zhang is the current holder of the Chinese records on 500 and 1000 metres. In 2018, she became a member of the International Olympic Committee (IOC). She is an executive board member of the Chinese Olympic Committee.

Merits
 Chinese National Winter Games 2012:  short-track (1000 m: 1.17,27 / 1.16,66 = 154.145),  500 m (38,45)
 2012 World Sprint Speed Skating Championships: Sprint 
 2014 World Sprint Speed Skating Championships: Sprint 
 2014 Winter Olympics – 1000 meters: 
 2016 World Single Distance Speed Skating Championships – 500 meters:

Personal bests

 Total points sprint: 37,63 + 37,87 + 1.14,44 + 1.13,97 = 149.705 (bronze medal and the third best ever total points record)

References

External links
 

1988 births
Chinese female speed skaters
Speed skaters at the 2014 Winter Olympics
Speed skaters at the 2018 Winter Olympics
Olympic speed skaters of China
Medalists at the 2014 Winter Olympics
Olympic medalists in speed skating
Olympic gold medalists for China
Asian Games medalists in speed skating
Speed skaters at the 2017 Asian Winter Games
Asian Games bronze medalists for China
Medalists at the 2017 Asian Winter Games
Sportspeople from Harbin
Living people
International Olympic Committee members
20th-century Chinese women
21st-century Chinese women